Priya Kambli (born 1975) is an Indian photographer.

Early life and education
Kambli was born in India. She received a BFA degree from the University of Louisiana at Lafayette and an MFA degree from the University of Houston.

Career
Her work is included in the collection of the Museum of Fine Arts Houston, Light Work, and the Museum of Contemporary Photography.

Kambli is a professor of art at Truman State University, Missouri.

References

Living people
1975 births
20th-century Indian photographers
21st-century Indian photographers
20th-century Indian women artists
21st-century Indian women artists